Philippe François de Ligne, (30 July 1625 - 17 December 1674), 7th Duke of Aarschot,  1st Duke of Arenberg, a Knight of the Order of the Golden Fleece, was the first son of the second  marriage of Philippe Charles, Comte d'Arenberg and Isabelle Claire de Berlaymont.

On 14 July 1642 Philippe François married 15-year-old Magdalena de Borja y Doria, the elder sister of Ana Francisca de Borja y Doria. In 1646, aged 21, Philipe was made a Knight of the Order of the Golden Fleece.

Their children:
François of Arenberg (5 September 1643 - 10 September 1643). 
Isabelle Claire Eugénie of Arenberg (12 July 1644 - 5 October 1655).

When he died in December 1674, the title passed to his half-brother, Charles Eugene, Duke of Arenberg,  (1633–1681), who was promoted to become a Knight of the Order of the Golden Fleece in 1678.

References
The Arenberg archives

External link

1625 births
1674 deaths
Dukes of Aarschot
Dukes of Arenberg
Arenberg family
Knights of the Golden Fleece
Place of birth missing